Strictly Personal is a 1968  album by Captain Beefheart and his Magic Band. It may also refer to:

 Strictly Personal (The Romantics album), released in 1981
 Strictly Personal (film), a 1933 drama 
 “Strictly Personal”, a weekday syndicated newspaper column written by Sydney J. Harris
 Strictly Personal, a 1941 autobiography by W. Somerset Maugham - see List of works by W. Somerset Maugham
 Strictly Personal, a 1974 book by John Eisenhower
 Strictly Personal: Manmohan and Gursharan, a book by Daman Singh
 “Strictly Personal”, a 1995 episode of British TV series The Bill
 “Strictly Personal”, an episode of the 1986 American sitcom Mr. Sunshine

See also
 Strictement personnel (English translation: Strictly Personal), a 1985 French film directed and written by Pierre Jolivet